Jeff Davidson (born October 3, 1967) is an American football coach who most recently served as the offensive line coach for the Detroit Lions of the National Football League (NFL) and is also a former player. He has also spent time as offensive line coach of the New England Patriots and Denver Broncos and as offensive coordinator of the Carolina Panthers and Cleveland Browns.

Playing career

High school
Davidson attended Westerville North High School in Westerville, Ohio and was a letterman in football.  He was also all state in football as well as all state in track & field in the shot put, where he holds his high school's school record at 60'3."

College
Davidson attended and played football for the Ohio State Buckeyes from 1986 to 1989. He became a starter at offensive guard as a junior and earned All-Big Ten honors as a senior.

He was also selected as a co-captain as a senior. His father Jim, an All-American tackle, had been Buckeye co-captain in 1964. The Davidsons became the first father-son captain duo in Ohio State history.  They were followed by the Herbstreits (1960/1992) and the Johnsons (1984-1985/2007).

NFL
Davidson was drafted by the Denver Broncos in the 5th round of the 1990 NFL Draft. He was with the Broncos for four seasons before signing with the New Orleans Saints in 1994, and retiring after suffering a shoulder injury.

Coaching career

New England Patriots
After retiring, Davidson stayed with the New Orleans Saints as a volunteer assistant in 1995. He was made an offensive assistant by the Saints in 1996. In 1997, he was hired by the New England Patriots as their tight ends coach. At the end of the season, the Patriots promoted him to assistant offensive line coach, where he remained from 1998-2001. In 2002, he again became the tight ends coach while retaining his assistant offensive line coaching duties.

Cleveland Browns
When Patriots defensive coordinator Romeo Crennel left to become the Browns' head coach for the 2005 season, Davidson followed Crennel to Cleveland as the Browns' offensive line coach. In 2006, Davidson was named the team's assistant head coach/offensive line coach. After  six games of the Browns' season, offensive coordinator Maurice Carthon was fired and Davidson promoted in his place.

Carolina Panthers
Davidson was hired on January 24, 2007 as the offensive coordinator of the Carolina Panthers. Having worked as a member of the New England Patriots' staff under Charlie Weis, Davidson forged a close relationship with him. Weis is a good friend of former Panthers head coach John Fox, and it is believed that his recommendation was instrumental in Fox's decision to hire Davidson. With his playing and coaching experience at the offensive line and additional coaching with tight ends, most believe this hire meant that Coach Fox wanted to keep his focus on a powerful offense based on a strong running game, as has been his tendency in the past.

Minnesota Vikings
Head Coach Leslie Frazier announced Davidson would be joining the Vikings as offensive line coach on January 20, 2011.

On January 12, 2016, head coach Mike Zimmer announced that Davidson's contract would not be renewed for the 2016 NFL season.

San Diego Chargers
On January 14, 2016, the San Diego Chargers announced Jeff Davidson for new offensive line coach.

Denver Broncos
On January 14, 2017 Davidson was named offensive line coach of the Denver Broncos, joining recently fired San Diego Chargers head coach Mike McCoy on the offensive staff for head coach Vance Joseph.

Detroit Lions
On February 7, 2018, Davidson was named offensive line coach of the Detroit Lions. On January 2, 2020, Davidson announced he was taking an "indefinite leave" from coaching.

References

1967 births
Living people
Carolina Panthers coaches
Cleveland Browns coaches
Denver Broncos players
Detroit Lions coaches
Minnesota Vikings coaches
National Football League offensive coordinators
New Orleans Saints players
New Orleans Saints coaches
New England Patriots coaches
Ohio State Buckeyes football players